Valentin Zlatev (born 8 December 1965) is a Bulgarian businessman.He is former representative of the Russian oil giant LUKoil and former president of basketball club Lukoil Akademik.

He is married to Lyuba Stefanova, who won the Miss Plovdiv competition in 2001, and they have three children – two sons named Vasil and Anton and a daughter named Kristina.

References

1965 births
Living people
People from Pravets
Bulgarian businesspeople